StrategyOne, Inc., d/b/a Edelman Intelligence, is a global research and analytics consultancy firm owned by Edelman. 

Led by Antoine Harary, the firm oversees the agency’s approach to reputation, branding and communications research. The firm helps companies and organizations understand their markets and environment, segment and profile key audiences, optimize content and messaging, and measure the impact of campaigns and business outcomes. 

Edelman Intelligence was ranked among the top 50 U.S. market research and analytics companies in the American Marketing Association’s (AMA) 2018 Gold Report.

Notable research 
Its research has been highlighted in a number of major news outlets including the Wall Street Journal, the New York Times, the Washington Post, and USA Today.

Trust Barometer 

Edelman Intelligence is the research company behind the Edelman Trust Barometer, an international study conducted in 25 countries that focuses on the principles of trust in business, government, media and NGOs.

References

External links
 Edelman Intelligence

Public opinion research companies in the United States
Market research companies of the United States
Companies based in New York City